Makhaleng is a constituency located in the Maseru District of Lesotho. Its population in 2006 was 21,269.

Community Councils
The constituency of Makhaleng includes the communities of: 
 Makhalaneng
 Ribaneng

References

Populated places in Maseru District